Senator Apple may refer to:

Adam Apple (1831–1905), Wisconsin State Senate
Pat Apple (born 1957), Kansas State Senate